Cartersville Airport , Valley of Pumpkinvine Creek Field, is a public use airport located on a small hill by the Etowah River two nautical miles (4km) west of the headwaters of Pumpkinvine Creek and three nautical miles (6 km) southwest of the central business district of Cartersville, in Bartow County, Georgia, United States. It is owned by the Cartersville Bartow Airport Authority.

Although many U.S. airports use the same three-letter location identifier for the FAA and IATA, this facility is assigned VPC by the FAA but has no designation from the IATA.

Facilities and aircraft 
It has one runway designated 1/19 with an asphalt surface measuring 5,760 by 100 feet (1,756 x 30 m).

For the 12-month period ending April 23, 2009, the airport had 50,500 aircraft operations, an average of 138 per day: 89% general aviation, 10% air taxi, and 1% military. At that time there were 145 aircraft based at this airport: 53% single-engine, 19% multi-engine, 15% jet, 1% helicopter and 12% ultralight.

References

External links 
 Aerial photo from USGS The National Map
 

Airports in Georgia (U.S. state)
Buildings and structures in Bartow County, Georgia
Transportation in Bartow County, Georgia